4, also known as Foreigner 4, is the fourth studio album by the British-American rock band Foreigner, released on July 3, 1981, on Atlantic Records. Several singles from the album were hits, including "Urgent", "Waiting for a Girl Like You" and "Juke Box Hero". 

The album name represented the band's fourth studio album and also the band's reduction from six to four members. Musically, it showed Foreigner shifting from hard rock to more accessible mainstream rock and pop music.

The album was a success worldwide, holding the #1 position on the Billboard album chart for a total of 10 weeks.  It eventually sold over six million copies in the US alone.

Background and writing
The album was originally titled Silent Partners and later was changed to 4, reflecting both the fact that it was Foreigner's fourth album and that the band was now down to four members. In 1981, art studio Hipgnosis was asked to design a cover based on the original title, and they developed a black and white image of a young man in bed with a pair of binoculars suspended in the air overhead. The resulting design was rejected by the band as they felt it was "too homosexual". The replacement cover for 4 was designed by Bob Defrin and modeled after an old fashioned film leader. Hipgnosis is still credited with designing the record labels.

Both Ian McDonald and Al Greenwood had left before the recording of 4, part because they wanted to take a more significant role in writing songs, while Mick Jones wanted to control the songwriting along with Lou Gramm. As a result, all of the songs on the album are compositions by Jones and/or Gramm. McDonald and Greenwood had played saxophone and keyboards, respectively, and so several session musicians were needed to replace their contributions, among them Junior Walker, who played the saxophone solo in the bridge of "Urgent", and a young Thomas Dolby, who soon leveraged this collaboration into a successful solo career.

The album took 10 months to produce.  During that time they went from starting work at the recording studio around noon to starting around midnight.  This changing schedule helped inspire the opening song on the album, "Night Life."  According to Jones "The later it got at night, the bigger the buzz got, and a lot of weird characters, some of them hookers, would appear. It was a big mixture of a lot of different characters – so that was the inspiration for opening song, 'Night Life.'”

Reception
The editors of Classic Rock called 4 Foreigner's "masterpiece."  Ultimate Classic Rock critic Matt Wardlaw rated four of the songs from 4 - "Juke Box Hero," "Waiting for a Girl Like You," "Urgent" and "Night Life" among  Foreigner's top 10 songs.  Ultimate Classic Rock critic Eduardo Rivadavia rated two of the songs from 4 - "Girl on the Moon" and "Woman in Black" among  Foreigner's 10 most underrated songs.  Classic Rock critic Malcolm Dome also rated two songs from 4, but two different ones, as being among Foreigner's 10 most underrated – "I’m Gonna Win," which he compares to "Juke Box Hero," at #8 and "Night Life," – which he praises for its " confident energy," at #1.  On the other hand, PopMatters critic Evan Sawdey called "Night Life" a "remarkably limp album opener."

Jones has rated three of the songs from 4 ("Urgent," "Juke Box Hero" and "Girl on the Moon") as being among his 11 favorite Foreigner songs.

Track listing

Personnel

Foreigner 
 Lou Gramm – lead vocals, percussion
 Mick Jones – keyboards, guitars, backing vocals
 Rick Wills – bass, backing vocals
 Dennis Elliott – drums, backing vocals

Additional personnel 
 Thomas Dolby – main synthesizers
 Larry Fast – sequential synthesizer (2, 3, 10)
 Bob Mayo – keyboard textures (3, 4)
 Michael Fonfara – keyboard textures (6, 9)
 Hugh McCracken – slide guitar (9)
 Mark Rivera – saxophone (3, 6), backing vocals
 Junior Walker – saxophone solo (6)
 Ian Lloyd – backing vocals
 Robert John "Mutt" Lange – backing vocals

Production 
 Produced by Robert John "Mutt" Lange and Mick Jones
 Recorded and engineered by Dave Wittman (chief engineer) and Tony Platt (basic tracks).
 Second engineer – Brad Samuelsohn
 Assistant engineers – Edwin Hobgood and Michel Sauvage
 Mastered by George Marino at Sterling Sound (New York, NY).
 Art Direction – Bob Defrin
 Design – Hipgnosis
 Management – Bud Prager

Surround releases
4 was released in 2001 in multichannel DVD-Audio, and on September 14, 2011, on hybrid stereo-multichannel Super Audio CD by Warner Japan in their Warner Premium Sound series.
June 2015 saw its re-release on Atlantic Records premium 180-gram vinyl with its original 1981 classic track listing.

Charts

Weekly charts

Year-end charts

Certifications

References

Foreigner (band) albums
1981 albums
Albums produced by Robert John "Mutt" Lange
Albums produced by Mick Jones (Foreigner)
Atlantic Records albums
Albums recorded at Electric Lady Studios

it:4 (disambigua)#Musica